Freedom Sound is an album by Poncho Sanchez, released in 1997. The trombonist Wayne Henderson and the saxophonist Wilton Felder, both of the Jazz Crusaders, appear on the album.

Critical reception
The Washington Post thought that "Sanchez's percussion-heavy band applies leisurely, syncopated arrangements to such Jazz Crusader chestnuts as 'Scratch', 'MJ's Funk', 'Latin Bit' and 'Aleluia', both with and without the special guests." The Philadelphia Daily News called the album "a careful mix of Latin jazz, salsa, standard ballads and old Jazz Crusader tunes tweaked with Latin rhythms."

AllMusic wrote that "the title track leans toward a 6/8 jazz feeling, and 'MJ's Funk' is a more or less straight-ahead blues, both butting horns with Sanchez's domineering congas."

Track listing
 "Brown & Blue" – 	4:53
 "Transdance" – 	5:26
 "Aleluia" – 	5:27
 "Freedom Sound" – 	6:27
 "You Don't Know What Love Is" – 	6:20
 "Prestame Tu Corazon" – 	5:24
 "MJ's Funk" – 	2:52
 "(Baila El) Suave Cha" – 	3:40
 "When We Were One" – 	8:12
 "Latin Bit" – 	4:15
 "Scratch" – 	5:49

Personnel
Poncho Sanchez  – Arranger, Conga, Vocals, Mixing
Ramon Banda  – Drums, Timbales
Tony Banda  – Bass (Electric), Bass (Acoustic)
Sal Cracchiolo  – Trumpet, Flugelhorn
Wilton Felder  – Sax (Tenor)
Alex Henderson  – Trombone, Didjeridu
Wayne Henderson  – Trombone
Scott Martin – Flute, Sax (Alto), Sax (Baritone), Sax (Tenor)
José Papo Rodríguez  – Percussion, Bongos, Conga
David Torres – Piano, Arranger, Mixing

Production

Chris Bellman  – Mastering
John Burk  – Producer
Jim Cassell  – Associate Producer
Jordan d'Alessio  – Assistant Engineer
Mike Hoaglin  – Production Manager
Bernie Kirsh  – Engineer, Mixing
Robert Reed  – Assistant Engineer
Larry Sanchez  – Equipment Technician

References

	

1997 albums
Poncho Sanchez albums
Concord Records albums